Sodium-dependent phosphate transport protein 2A, also known as Na+-Pi cotransporter 2a (NaPi-2a), is a protein in humans that is encoded by the SLC34A1 gene. This gene encodes a member of the type II sodium-phosphate cotransporter family.

Function 

The sodium/phosphate cotransporter is a protein found in the proximal tubule of the nephron. It is responsible for reabsorbing approximately 80% of the phosphate that has been filtered out at the glomerulus. The transporter moves hydrogen phosphate (HPO42−) into the cell along with 3 sodium ions. Alternatively it can move dihydrogen phosphate (H2PO4− along with 2 sodium ions. For both movements the net charge is +1. Once inside the cell hydrogen phosphate and dihydrogen phosphate may react with water to form each other. Transport of these chemicals out of the cell at the basolateral surface is not understood currently.

The NaPi channels are regulated by parathyroid hormone (PTH). PTH acts to decrease phosphate reabsorption from the renal filtrate and therefore promote its excretion into the urine. It does this by causing for endocytosis of NaPi transporters on the apical surface of the cell. With less transporter available more phosphate is lost in the urine.

Clinical significance 

Mutations in this gene are associated with hypophosphatemia nephrolithiasis/osteoporosis 1.

See also 
 Renal physiology
 Cotransporter
 Co-transport
 P-loop
 Solute carrier family

References

Further reading

External links 
 

Solute carrier family